Woodrow Wilson (1856–1924) was the president of the United States from 1913 to 1921.

Woodrow Wilson may also refer to:

 Woodrow Wilson "Woody" Guthrie (1912–1967), American folk singer
 Woodrow Wilson (baseball) (1916–1965), American Negro leagues baseball player
 Woodrow Wilson "Woody" Paige (born 1946), American sportswriter
 Woodrow Wilson "Red" Sovine (1917–1980), American country and Western singer
 Woodrow "Woodie" Wilson (1925–1994), American stock car racing driver
 Robert Woodrow Wilson (born 1936), American astronomer
John Woodrow Wilson (1922–2015), American artist

See also
SS President Wilson
Woodrow Wilson High School (disambiguation)
Woody Wilson (disambiguation)